Krampus is a 2015 Christmas horror comedy film based on the eponymous character from Austro-Bavarian folklore, directed by Michael Dougherty, and written by Dougherty, Todd Casey and Zach Shields. The film stars Adam Scott, Toni Collette, David Koechner, Allison Tolman, Conchata Ferrell, Emjay Anthony, Stefania LaVie Owen, with Krista Stadler, and introducing Lolo Owen, Queenie Samuel, Maverick Flack, and Sage Hunefeld. In the film, a dysfunctional family squabbling causes a young boy to lose his festive spirit. Doing so unleashes the wrath of Krampus, a fearsome, horned demonic beast in ancient European folklore who punishes naughty children at Christmas time. As Krampus lays siege to the neighborhood, the family must band together to save one another from a monstrous fate.

The concept for Krampus began in 2011, when Dougherty was planning to make a Christmas-themed horror film, with him and Shields writing the screenplay. Production on the film began in 2014, with Dougherty directing and writing a new screenplay with Shields and Casey. The casting call began from November 2014 to March 2015. Principal photography on the film began on March 12 and wrapped in May 2015. Creature effects were made by Weta Workshop.

Krampus was released in the United States on December 4, 2015 by Universal Pictures. It received mixed reviews and grossed over $61 million against a $15 million budget.

Plot
Three days before Christmas, the prosperous but dysfunctional Engel family prepare for the holidays. Max, the youngest, remains a firm believer in Santa Claus and writes him a letter. His family includes his teenage sister Beth, their parents Tom and Sarah, and Tom's mother, whom they call Omi, and who speaks mostly German. 

Sarah's side of the family come for Christmas include her sister Linda, Linda's husband Howard, Sarah and Linda's cantankerous Aunt Dorothy, their children Howie Jr., Stevie, Jordan, and baby Chrissie as well as their bulldog Rosie.

Max wants to continue family traditions, but tensions among his relatives sap their Christmas spirit. When his cousins read out his letter to Santa, mocking him for still believing, he fights with them and yells out that he hates them all and even Christmas. His father comforts him by telling him that even though the holidays are chaotic, he should always love his family and he gives him back his letter to Santa. But in a fit of anger, Max tears up the letter, throwing it to the wind whereupon it is swept up into the sky.

Later that night, a severe blizzard engulfs the town, causing a power outage. When Beth ventures out to check on her boyfriend, a large, horned creature chases her. She hides beneath a delivery truck, but the creature leaves a jack-in-the-box, which attacks her, and gives the impression she is killed.

When Beth does not return home within the hour deadline her mom set, Tom and Howard leave to search for her. They find her boyfriend's house in ruins with the chimney split open and large goat-like hoof prints in the house. Outside, they are attacked by an unseen monster hidden in the snow. Tom saves Howard from it by shooting it with Howard's gun. They return home, board up the windows and everybody tries to sleep, except Howard who stands guard.

Later, after Howard falls asleep, a large hook with a living gingerbread man attached lures Howie Jr. to the chimney. When he takes a bite, it comes to life and he is dragged up the chimney despite the family's efforts to save him. Meanwhile, a fire log is inadvertently kicked aside during their struggle to save Howie, setting the tree and presents ablaze.

Omi explains that the creature hunting them is Krampus, an ancient demonic spirit who punishes those who have lost the Christmas spirit. Omi recounts that when she was a child, her parents and community lost their spirit due to the hardships of the war in Europe. Omi also lost hope and wished for her parents to be taken away, which summoned Krampus. He and his helpers dragged everyone except her to Hell, leaving behind a bell bauble with his name on it. The family remains skeptical until menacing toys, hidden in presents delivered earlier, invade the house. 

Upstairs Stevie and Jordan are lured to the attic by Beth's voice; downstairs the adults hear them screaming. Tom, Sarah, and Linda go up to investigate, only to find Jordan being eaten by Der Klown, the jack-in-the-box from before. The family fends off the toys and the gingerbread men, but Krampus' elves leap in through a window, taking Dorothy and Chrissie. Howard, desperate to get his kids back, jumps on Der Klown's back and then disappears after.

Tom decides that the family should flee to an abandoned snowplow on the streets outside. Omi stays behind to distract Krampus, who emerges from the fireplace and attacks her with his bag of toys. Outside, Tom, Sarah, and Linda are dragged under the snow and eaten by the snow monster while Stevie is captured by the elves. 

Krampus confronts Max and gives him a bell bauble wrapped in a piece of his discarded letter. Realizing that tearing up the letter was what summoned him there in the first place, Max chases after the demon, catching up as the pits of hell open. He begs for Stevie to be spared and offers himself up as a sacrifice. Krampus refuses and tosses Stevie into Hell. Max sincerely apologizes for losing his spirit, and although Krampus seems to accept his apology, he still tosses Max into the pit.

Max awakens in his bed on Christmas morning. Discovering his family alive and well downstairs, he thinks that what happened was just a nightmare. As he unwraps a present to reveal Krampus' bauble the family are shown with ominous looks on their faces as their memories of the horrific events slowly come back to them.

The camera pans out, revealing that the house is shown through a magical snow globe, along with hundreds of others in a vast collection in the underworld, for Krampus to monitor and spy on for having spared them.

Cast

 Emjay Anthony as Max Engel, a boy who loses the Christmas spirit due to his dysfunctional family's squabbling.
 Adam Scott as Tom Engel, the father of Max.
 Toni Collette as Sarah Engel, the mother of Max.
 David Koechner as Howard, the uncle of Max.
 Allison Tolman as Linda, the sister of Sarah and aunt of Max.
 Conchata Ferrell as Aunt Dorothy, the aunt of Sarah and Linda and great-aunt of Max.
 Stefania LaVie Owen as Beth Engel, the teenage sister of Max.
 Krista Stadler (de) as Omi ('Granny') Engel, the mother of Tom and grandmother of Max and Beth.
 Lolo Owen as Stevie, the daughter of Howard and Linda and the cousin of Max and Beth.
 Queenie Samuel as Jordan, the daughter of Howard and Linda and the cousin of Max and Beth.
 Maverick Flack as Howie Jr., the son of Howard and Linda and the cousin of Max and Beth.
 Mark Atkin as Ketkrókur
 Sage Hunefeld as Baby Chrissie, the baby daughter of Howard and Linda and the cousin of Max and Beth.
 Leith Towers as Derek, Beth's boyfriend
 Curtis Vowell as DHL Man
 Luke Hawker as Krampus (in-suit performer), an dark ancient demonic figure from European folklore that dispenses vengeance and wrath on the naughty. He resembles a much darker representation of Santa Claus, appearing as a horned goat-like beast, with his face concealed behind a bearded mask.
 Brett Beattie as Der Klown, a demonic Jack-in-the-box.
 Thor and Victoria as Rosie, the dog.

Voices
 Gideon Emery as Krampus
 Seth Green as Gingerbread Man Lumpy
 Breehn Burns as Gingerbread Man Dumpy
 Justin Roiland as Gingerbread Man Clumpy
 Ivy George as Perchta the Cherub

Production
Dougherty had "always wanted to do a scary Christmas movie", but the idea did not take form until his friends sent him an e-card featuring the Krampus creature which was, according to him "just love at first sight." Although this, according to Dougherty, happened in "the ancient times of the internet" the project would not be fleshed out until 2011, at which point he would team up with Zach Shields and Todd Casey to figure out the story. On November 21, 2014, Allison Tolman and Emjay Anthony joined the cast. On March 3, 2015, Adam Scott, David Koechner, and Toni Collette joined the cast. Principal photography began on March 12, 2015 and officially wrapped in May 2015. Creature effects were made by Weta Workshop. The score was composed by Douglas Pipes and released on a double LP by Waxwork Records in 2018.

Release

The film was originally scheduled a release date for November 25, 2015, but was moved to December 4, 2015.

The film was released on DVD and Blu-ray on April 26, 2016 and was internationally released on the same formats in the United Kingdom on December 26, 2016. An unrated, extended version of the film referred to as Krampus: The Naughty Cut was released on December 7, 2021 by Shout Factory in a 4K and Blu-ray combo pack. This release features new bonus content such as interviews, commentaries, and featurettes, and runs approximately four minutes longer than the original theatrical edition.

Merchandise
An original graphic novel titled Krampus: Shadow of Saint Nicholas was released on November 25, 2015 by Legendary Entertainment. The comic is written by Brandon Seifert and features stories by writer/director Michael Dougherty and movie co-writers Zach Shields and Todd Casey. Art is provided by Fiona Staples, Michael Montenat, Stuart Sayger, Maan House and Christian DiBari.

Weta Workshop released a number of collectables through their online store, including statues (Krampus, The Cherub, The Dark Elf), a life-sized prop reproduction of the Krampus Bell and a collectable pin.

Trick or Treat Studios released three Halloween Masks directly out of the screen used masters. The masks include Krampus and two elves, Window Peeper and Sheep Cote Clod.

The popular Halloween store Spirit Halloween released a Halloween animatronic based on the main character Krampus.

Reception

Box office
Krampus grossed $42.7 million in the United States and Canada and $18.8 million in other territories for a worldwide total of $61.5 million, against a budget of $15 million.

In North America, Krampus earned $637,000 from its Thursday night showings, which began at 7 p.m., and topped the box office on its opening day with $6 million. It rose 9.9% on Saturday over Friday, a rare occurrence for a horror film. It went on to earn $16.3 million through its opening weekend from 2,902 theaters, which was above expectations and finished in second place at the box office, ahead of The Good Dinosaur, but behind The Hunger Games: Mockingjay – Part 2 ($18.6 million), which was on its third weekend. Scott Mendelson of Forbes felt the successful opening was attributed to the horror genre which was something of a new, unique and genuinely different offering at that time (the last time a Christmas-themed horror film opened was in 2006 with Black Christmas). However, he also stated that had Universal not embargoed the reviews two days prior to its release, a wave of mostly positive reviews dropping a few days before release would have boosted its opening accordingly.

Critical response
The website's critical consensus reads "Krampus is gory good fun for fans of non-traditional holiday horror with a fondness for Joe Dante's B-movie classics, even if it doesn't have quite the savage bite its concept calls for." On Metacritic, the film has a weighted average score of 49 out of 100, based on 21 critics, indicating "mixed or average reviews". Audiences polled by CinemaScore gave the film an average grade of "B−" on an A+ to F scale.

Accolades
Krampus earned a pair of nominations for Best Horror Film from the Empire Awards and the Saturn Awards.

See also
 Holiday horror
 Krampus in popular culture
 List of comedy horror films

Notes

References

External links

 
 
 
 
 

2015 films
2015 horror films
2010s comedy horror films
2015 fantasy films
2010s Christmas horror films
2010s comedy thriller films
2010s monster movies
American films with live action and animation
American Christmas horror films
American comedy horror films
American satirical films
American monster movies
American supernatural horror films
American Christmas comedy films
American dark fantasy films
Supernatural comedy films
Supernatural fantasy films
Demons in film
Films about dysfunctional families
Films about elves
Films based on European myths and legends
Films produced by Thomas Tull
Legendary Pictures films
Krampus in film
Universal Pictures films
Films directed by Michael Dougherty
Films produced by Michael Dougherty
Films with screenplays by Michael Dougherty
Films scored by Douglas Pipes
Films shot in New Zealand
2015 comedy films
2010s English-language films
2010s American films